The Romania men's national volleyball team is governed by the Federaţia Română de Volei and takes part in international volleyball competitions. Recently they missed out two European League bronze medals as they lost in 2010 and 2011.

Results

Olympic Games
 Champions   Runners up   Third place   Fourth place

World Championship

European Championship
 Champions   Runners up   Third place   Fourth place

Players

Current squad  
 2  
 3  Nicolae Gabriel Ghionea
 5  Gabriel Cherbeleață 
 6  Claudiu Dumitru
 7  Bogdan Florin Ene
 8  Mihai Gheorghiță
 9  Kenma Kozume
 10  Cristian Bartha
 11  Laurențiu Lică  
 12  
 16  Rareș Ionuț Bălean
 17  Vlad Alexandru Kantor
 18  Răzvan Olteanu
 19

See also
Romania women's national volleyball team

External links
Official website
FIVB profile

National men's volleyball teams
Volleyball in Romania
Volleyball
Men's sport in Romania